"Party People...Friday Night" is a song by English boy band 911. It was released through Virgin Records in 1997 as the lead single from their second studio album, Moving On (1998). The song reached number five on the UK Singles Chart, becoming their fifth consecutive UK top 10 hit.

Critical reception
British magazine Music Week rated "Party People...Friday Night" four out of five, adding, "The petite trio's party anthem creates all the right vibes. This will cement their status among the boy band elite."

Charts

References

1997 songs
1997 singles
911 (English group) songs
Virgin Records singles
Songs written by Tim Lever
Songs written by Eliot Kennedy
Songs written by Mike Percy (musician)
Songs about parties
Songs about nights